iSouljaBoyTellem is the second studio album by American rapper Soulja Boy. It was released on December 16, 2008, by Collipark Music, Stacks on Deck Entertainment and Interscope Records. The album was mostly produced by Soulja Boy, along with several record producers such as Drumma Boy, Jim Jonsin, J.U.S.T.I.C.E. League and Zaytoven, as well as the guest appearances from Gucci Mane, Shawty Lo and Yo Gotti, among others. The album was supported by three singles: "Bird Walk", "Kiss Me Thru the Phone" featuring Sammie, and "Turn My Swag On".

iSouljaBoyTellem debuted at number 43 on the US Billboard 200, selling 46,000 copies in its first week. The album received negative reviews from music critics, who saw it as recycled material from his previous album.

Background
The album's first original single was intended to be "iDance", which was released online back in 2008. However, the song was dropped from the album for unknown reasons, with the possibility of "Bird Walk" catering more than towards Soulja Boy's original breakout single "Crank That (Soulja Boy)".

Singles 
"Bird Walk" was released as the album's lead single on October 23, 2008. The song only managed to peak at number 2 on the US Bubbling Under Hot 100 Singles.

"Kiss Me Thru the Phone" featuring Sammie, was released as the album's second single on November 28, 2008. The song peaked at number 3 on the US Billboard Hot 100, becoming the rapper's second top ten hit on the chart.

"Turn My Swag On" was released as the album's third single on October 25, 2008. The song peaked at number 19 on the Billboard Hot 100 in the United States.

Other songs 
The music video for "Soulja Boy Tell 'Em" was released on November 9, 2008. The music video for "Gucci Bandanna" featuring Gucci Mane and Shawty Lo, was released on April 23, 2009.

Critical reception 

iSouljaBoyTellem received negative reviews from music critics, who felt that it was recycled material from his previous album. AllMusic's David Jeffries said that the album came up short when trying to re-create the success of "Crank That" but praised "Shopping Spree" in that it "suggests some crossover hopes and desire for hardcore rap acceptance." Steve 'Flash' Juon of RapReviews said that the music "improved drastically" but still found the lyrics to be "as vapid and materialistic as it was before," concluding with, "Your best bet is to find a website you can listen to snippets of this album on and if one or two tracks strike your fancy, buy those. A whole album of SB's idiotic raps is still too much for one man or woman to take no matter how much better the beats are." Writing for Rolling Stone, Christian Hoard also commented on how the beats were more bulky but the delivery in the songs lacked charm in them.

Track listing

Personnel 
Adapted from the iSouljaBoyTellem liner notes.

 Michael "Mr. ColliPark" Crooms: executive producer
 Derrick Crooms: Collipark Music A&R, Rockfort Management
 Charlotte Crooms: Collipark Music Administrative Coordinator
 Phillip Ransom, Esq.: Music Legal Representation for Soulja Boy
 Karl Marcellus Washington, Esq.: Legal Representation for Collipark Music Inc.
 DJ Mormile & Manny Smith: Interscope A&R
 Terrence Nelson: A&R Coordinator
 Brian Washington: marketing director
 Ravid Yosef: All Things Mobile
 Aaron Foreman & Kendra Ellis: digital marketing
 Greg Miller: publicity
 Randy Sosin: video production
 Michael Cole & Jennifer Zeller: video promotion
 Don Robinson: international marketing
 Erika Savage: business affairs
 Ianthe Zevos: creative
 SLANG Inc.: art direction/design
 Zach Wolfe: photography
 Cliff Feiman: production supervisor

Charts

Weekly charts

Year-end charts

References

2008 albums
Soulja Boy albums
Interscope Records albums
Albums produced by Drumma Boy
Albums produced by Mr. Collipark
Albums produced by Polow da Don
Albums produced by Jim Jonsin
Albums produced by Zaytoven